K. Radhakrishnan (born 24 May 1964) is an Indian politician, who is currently serving as Minister for Welfare of Scheduled Castes, Scheduled Tribes and Backward Classes, Devaswoms, Parliamentary Affairs of  Government of Kerala in second Pinarayi Vijayan ministry and central committee member of the CPI(M). He was a former Speaker of the Kerala Legislative Assembly from 2006 to 2011. He is a  politician from Thrissur and also served as the Minister of SC / ST Affairs and Youth Affairs in the third E. K. Nayanar ministry from 1996 to 2001. He was elected from Chelakkara constituency. He served as the MLA of Chelakkara from 1996 to 2016.

Early life
He was born on 24 May 1964 in pullikkanam Vagamon Idukki.

Political life
He was an active member in SFI, holding posts like unit secretary of  Sree Kerala Varma College, Chelakkara area secretary, and member of Thrissur district secretariat as an SFI leader. He also worked as Chelakkara Block Committee secretary  and state committee member of DYFI, and he is now CPI(M) central committee member. Radhakrishnan was elected to the Thrissur District Council in 1991 from the Vallathol Nagar division. He was elected to the Assembly in 1996, 2001 and 2006. He served as Minister for the Welfare of Backward and Scheduled Communities and Youth Affairs from 1996 to 2001. He was Opposition Chief Whip from 2001 to 2006.He was Thrissur District Secretary of CPI(M) from 2016 to 2018.

Elections

References

Malayali politicians
Politicians from Thrissur
Living people
Speakers of the Kerala Legislative Assembly
Sree Kerala Varma College alumni
Communist Party of India (Marxist) politicians from Kerala
1964 births
Kerala MLAs 1996–2001
Kerala MLAs 2001–2006
Kerala MLAs 2006–2011
Kerala MLAs 2011–2016
Kerala MLAs 2021–2026